Zak Thompson is an American former footballer who last played for Crystal Palace Baltimore in the PDL.  He was signed in 2008 as backup to Brian Rowland and Matthew Nelson.

Thompson previously played for Virginia Legacy in the USL Premier Development League.

He is currently in his third season as the Junior Varsity coach for Severna Park High School soccer team in Severna Park, Maryland.

Career statistics
(correct as of 26 March 2010)

References

American soccer players
Living people
Legacy 76 players
Crystal Palace Baltimore players
USL Second Division players
USL League Two players
Association football goalkeepers
1983 births
Towson Tigers men's soccer players
People from Severna Park, Maryland
Chesapeake Dragons players
Boston University Terriers men's soccer players